James Leslie (c.1610–1678) was a Scottish physician who was principal of Marischal College (later known as Aberdeen University) from 1661 to 1678.

Life
He was born in Aberdeen the son of Thomas Leslie a burgess. He studied medicine at Aberdeen University and qualified as a physician. In 1661 he replaced William Moir as principal of Marischal College.

He died in 1678. His position as principal was filled by Robert Paterson.

Family
He married three times: 
Firstly to Elizabeth Lumsden of Ruthrieston (d.1663) and had three children:

John Leslie
Marjory – married Robert Bruce
Ann Leslie – married John Forbes, Laird of Corse

Secondly he married Miss Gray, daughter of Provost Gray of Aberdeen by whom he had a daughter Elizabeth who married George Peacock and two other daughters, Catherine and Magdalen.

Lastly he married Margaret Bennet.

References
 

1678 deaths
Alumni of the University of Aberdeen
Academics of the University of Aberdeen
17th-century Scottish medical doctors